Stefanos Tsitsipas was the defending champion but chose not to defend his title.

Lorenzo Sonego won the title after defeating Dustin Brown 6–2, 6–1 in the final.

Seeds

Draw

Finals

Top half

Bottom half

References
Main Draw
Qualifying Draw

AON Open Challenger - Singles
2018 Singles
AON